Nature Coast Technical High School is a school located in Brooksville, Florida.

Notable alumni

Athletes 
 Matt Breida, NFL running back for the New York Giants

References

External links 
 Nature Coast Technical High
 Hernando County School Board
 Nature Coast Technical High Football

High schools in Hernando County, Florida
Public high schools in Florida
Magnet schools in Florida
Educational institutions established in 2003
2003 establishments in Florida